Glendale is a community-owned estate on the north-western coastline of the Duirinish peninsula on the island of Skye and is in the Scottish council area of Highland. The estate encompasses the small crofting townships of Skinidin, Colbost, Fasach, Glasphein, Holmisdale, Lephin, Hamaraverin, Borrodale, Milovaig and Waterstein, Feriniquarrie, Totaig, Glasphein, Hamara, and others

Etymology
The Gaelic name, Gleann Daill, is derived from gleann, meaning "valley", which usually refers to a harsher environment that can be steep and/or rocky, and dail meaning "field, dale, meadow, plain or river-meadow", which usually refers to fertile, arable land beside water. The Ordnance Survey (2005) suggest that dail may also mean "level field by a river". This makes the English translation read: "valley of river-meadows" or "valley of level fields by a river".

Mac an Tàilleir (2003) suggests that dail is derived from the Norse dalr, giving a tautological name, where both parts simply mean "valley".

Geography
The crofts are strung out along a small strath of oolitic loam, which is the basis for the good quality of the farming land. The hills above are underlain by basalt, which also provides good grazing for cattle and sheep.

History
During the unsettled times of the late nineteenth century, when the local crofters sought land reform, this area played an important part in the struggle. After the Battle of the Braes in 1882, the unrest spread to Glendale.

The landlords refused to allow the local population to collect wood from the shore for heating, and they had to use straw to thatch the houses as they were forbidden to cut rushes. Land was in short supply as the holdings had been sub-divided 40 years earlier to provide for those cleared from better land.

Led by John MacPherson, the crofters demanded the return of the common grazing land that had been taken from them. Taking direct action, they began grazing their cattle on this land, court orders for their removal notwithstanding. Police action in January 1883 proved ineffective and eventually a government official was sent to Skye on board the navy gunboat HMS Jackal to conduct negotiations. Five crofters including MacPherson agreed to stand in a token trial. They were sentenced to two months in jail and became known as the "Glendale martyrs", and are commemorated by a memorial in the village. It was also agreed that a Royal Commission, which became the Napier Commission, would be set up to investigate the crofters' grievances, which eventually resulted in the far-reaching Crofters Act of 1886.

Historian Neil Oliver stated that "what happened in Glendale was a hugely significant part of what was going on in the Highlands. The events that unfolded there were extraordinary. For communities to remember and teach the wider community about their own history is terrific".

In July 2010 there was a homecoming of the Glendale diaspora during which local man Iain MacPherson blew the horn once used by his great-grandfather John.

See also
Highland Land League
Battle of Glendale (Skye), a battle fought near Glendale, by combined forces of MacDonalds and MacLeods

Footnotes

Populated places in the Isle of Skye
Highland Estates
Community buyouts in Scotland